Athens is a borough in Bradford County, Pennsylvania, United States. The population was 3,749 in 1900 and 3,796 in 1910. The population was 3,265 at the 2020 census. Athens is in a small area locally known as "The Valley", a group of four contiguous communities in Pennsylvania and New York: Waverly, New York; South Waverly, Pennsylvania; Sayre, Pennsylvania; and Athens. The Valley has a population near 30,000.

In September 2011, Athens was heavily damaged by river flooding from Tropical Storm Lee. Much of Athens was under water, with the most damage in the downtown area along the river. Damage in nearby Tioga County, New York, was estimated at $100 million.

History
The Athens Historic District, Protection of the Flag Monument, and Spalding Memorial Library-Tioga Point Museum are listed on the National Register of Historic Places.

Geography
Athens is located in northern Bradford County at  (41.963809, -76.522608). It lies on land between the Susquehanna River to the east and the Chemung River to the west, extending southward to their confluence at Tioga Point. The borough of Sayre borders Athens to the north, and Athens Township borders the remainder of the borough, to the east, west, and south.

U.S. Route 220 passes through the west part of the borough as a four-lane limited access highway, with one exit (West Pine Street) within the borough limits. US-220 leads north to its terminus at Interstate 86 near the New York state line in South Waverly and south to Towanda. Pennsylvania Route 199 forms the borough's Main Street, leading north through Sayre to I-86, where it crosses the state line and becomes New York State Route 34. To the south, PA-199 crosses the Chemung River and ends at US-220. Front Street crosses the Susquehanna River to the east into unincorporated East Athens.

Demographics

2010
At the 2010 census there were 3,367 people, 1,422 households, and 833 families living in the borough. The racial makeup of the borough was 97.1% White, 0.9% African American, 0.1% Native American, 0.5% Asian, 0.2% from other races, and 1.2% from two or more races. Hispanic or Latino of any race were 1.4%.

There were 1,422 households, 30.2% had children under the age of 18 living with them, 41.1% were married couples living together, 13.3% had a female householder with no husband present, and 41.4% were non-families. 36.2% of households were made up of individuals, and 16.8% were one person aged 65 or older. The average household size was 2.28 and the average family size was 3.00.

The age distribution was 23.8% under the age of 18, 58.1% from 18 to 64, and 18.1% 65 or older. The median age was 41.4 years.

The median household income was $31,146 and the median family income  was $45,441. Males had a median income of $39,514 versus $25,476 for females. The per capita income for the borough was $19,453. About 9.2% of families and 14.5% of the population were below the poverty line, including 17.5% of those under age 18 and 12.4% of those age 65 or over.

2000
At the 2000 census there were 3,415 people, 1,427 households, and 857 families living in the borough. The racial makeup of the borough was 97.83% White, 0.91% African American, 0.15% Native American, 0.29% Asian, 0.23% from other races, and 0.59% from two or more races. Hispanic or Latino of any race were 1.00%.

There were 1,427 households, 31.2% had children under the age of 18 living with them, 43.3% were married couples living together, 13.9% had a female householder with no husband present, and 39.9% were non-families. 35.5% of households were made up of individuals, and 18.4% were one person aged 65 or older. The average household size was 2.29 and the average family size was 2.98.

The age distribution was 24.6% under the age of 18, 7.4% from 18 to 24, 26.4% from 25 to 44, 22.0% from 45 to 64, and 19.6% 65 or older. The median age was 39 years. For every 100 females, there were 79.5 males. For every 100 females age 18 and over, there were 74.5 males.

The median household income was $32,246 and the median family income was $42,837. Males had a median income of $33,625 versus $22,361 for females. The per capita income for the borough was $20,874. About 9.0% of families and 11.7% of the population were below the poverty line, including 10.0% of those under age 18 and 18.0% of those age 65 or over.

Notable people
Horatio Bridge (1806–1893), commodore of the United States Navy
Joshua Reed Giddings (1795–1864), congressman from Ohio
William Maxwell (1794–1856), railroad executive
Elsie Murray (1878–1965), psychologist and local historian
Danielle Staub (1962-) American television personality. Born Beverly Merrill, Staub was adopted and raised in Athens, Pennsylvania, graduating in 1983. In May 2009, she came to prominence after being cast in the reality television series The Real Housewives of New Jersey, as a main cast member for two seasons, and afterward as a friend for three more seasons.

References

Pennsylvania populated places on the Susquehanna River
Populated places established in 1783
Boroughs in Bradford County, Pennsylvania
1831 establishments in Pennsylvania